Eleocharis dulcis, the Chinese water chestnut or water chestnut, is a grass-like sedge native to Asia, tropical Africa, and Oceania. It is grown in many countries for its edible corms.

The water chestnut is not a nut but rather an aquatic vegetable that grows in marshes, under water, in the mud. The water caltrop, which also is referred to by the same name, is unrelated and often confused with the water chestnut.

The small, rounded corms have a crisp, white flesh and may be eaten raw, slightly boiled, or grilled, and often are pickled or tinned. They are a popular ingredient in Chinese dishes. In China, they are most often eaten raw, sometimes sweetened. They also may be ground into a flour form used for making water chestnut cake, which is common as part of dim sum cuisine. They are unusual among vegetables for remaining crisp even after being cooked or canned, because their cell walls are cross-linked and strengthened by certain phenolic compounds, such as oligomers of ferulic acid. This property is shared by other vegetables that remain crisp in this manner, including the tiger nut, lotus root and spurge nettle root. The corms contain the antibiotic agent puchiin, which is stable to high temperature. Apart from the edible corms, the leaves can be used for cattlefeed, mulch or compost.

If eaten uncooked, the surface of the plants may transmit fasciolopsiasis.

Ecology
In the dry season of the Northern Territory in Australia, magpie geese eat the bulbs of water chestnuts, allowing them to put on fat for the wet season and ensuring they are ready for breeding. In the wet season, water chestnut leaves are used to build their floating nests.

Nutrition
Raw water chestnuts are 74% water, 24% carbohydrates, 1% protein, and contain very little fat. In a 100-gram reference amount, raw water chestnuts supply  of food energy, are rich (20% or more of the Daily Value, DV) in vitamin B6 (25% DV), and contain moderate amounts of other B vitamins, manganese, and potassium (10% to 17% DV, table).

Taste

Raw water chestnuts are slightly sweet and crunchy. Boiled water chestnuts have a firm and slightly crunchy texture, with a mild and slightly nutty flavor that may easily be overpowered by seasonings or sauces with which the water chestnut is served or cooked. They may be combined with bamboo shoots, coriander, ginger, sesame oil, and snow peas. Steamed or sauteed vegetable dishes may contain water chestnuts, such as noodle or rice recipes. They may also be added to minced-meat fillings and dishes, such as Cantonese dim sum-style steamed meatballs, to add a crunchy texture. The Thai dessert thapthim krop, with water chestnuts as its main ingredient, was named one of the world's best 50 desserts in 2019 by CNN Travel.

Agronomic properties

Cultivation 
The crop needs continuously high soil temperatures, ideally . At , the corms begin to sprout. Soil is ideally a sandy loam with pH 6.5 to 7.2. The plant produces two types of subterranean rhizomes. Under long-daylength conditions, rhizomes grow horizontally and then turn upwards forming daughter plants. Under short-daylength conditions, the rhizomes grow downward and produce a corm at the tip. The photoperiod also significantly influences how fast the corms grow. Corms begin to develop much more slowly if the photoperiod exceeds 12 hours. The corms are also the propagating material. Alternatively, transplants can be used. Machinery such as tractor-mounted vegetable planters can be used for plantation.

Plant nutrition 
Nitrogen addition is beneficial for corm production, applying a dose before planting and another dose when corms begin to enlarge. Also organic mulch, especially mushroom compost, shows good results.

Harvest 
Once the corms turn dark brown, they should be harvested. If left in the soil after this point in time, corms will get sweeter, however shelf life will decline. The corms can be harvested using a modified gladiolus corm harvester once the paddy is drained. Alternatively, a "water-suction harvester" can be used without the need to drain the paddy. The corms have to be washed after harvest and brushed once they are dry.

Yield 

Storage 
At this temperature, transpiration and thus weight loss are minimized. This will also delay sprouting and minimize deterioration resulting from small injuries. Corms should not be stored at temperatures above  as otherwise the corms will begin to sprout. If the corms need to be stored longer term, they can also be kept in a bleach solution of 1000ppm.

Pests 
Chinese water chestnut is usually not very prone to pests; nevertheless, some animals and fungi may attack the plant: Water fowl may damage the stems and corms, especially when plants are young. Similarly, rodents and grazing animals pose a threat to the Chinese water chestnut, which may be discouraged by keeping the paddy inundated. Caddisfly larvae (Trichoptera) and other leaf-eating caterpillars also feed on the stems. However, unless complete defoliation below the waterline occurs, the plants can normally tolerate this damage. Plant hoppers (Fulgoridae) and scale insects feed on plant sap and may cause subsequent death. Other pests include the nematodes Ditylenchus and Dolichodorus heterocephalus. Fungal species can also attack the Chinese water chestnut. In warmer climates, a rust is caused by Uromyces, and Cylindrosporium eleocharidis causes stem blight.

References

External links

Porcher Michel H. et al. 1995 - 2020, Sorting Eleocharis Names. Multilingual Multiscript Plant Name Database - A Work in Progress. Institute for Land & Food Resources. The University of Melbourne (2004)

dulcis
Root vegetables
Plants described in 1833
Taxa named by August Wilhelm Henschel
Flora of Asia
Flora of Africa
Flora of Australia
Freshwater plants
Cormous plants
Taxa named by Nicolaas Laurens Burman